Selenium-binding protein 1 is a protein that in humans is encoded by the SELENBP1 gene.

This gene product belongs to the selenium-binding protein family. Selenium is an essential nutrient that exhibits potent anticarcinogenic properties, and deficiency of selenium may cause certain neurologic diseases. It has been proposed that the effects of selenium in preventing cancer and neurologic diseases may be mediated by selenium-binding proteins. The exact function of this gene is not known.

Interactions 

SELENBP1 has been shown to interact with USP33.

References

Further reading